The 2009 Miami FC season was the fourth season of the team in the USL First Division.  After playing in Miami for three years, the team moved in this period to Fort Lauderdale.  This year, the team finished in ninth place for the regular season.  They did not make the playoffs.  This was the last year of the team in the league as it eventually joined a group of other clubs that would leave the USL to form the new North American Soccer League.  However, the team would play the following year in the USSF Division 2.

USL First Division Regular season

Standings

† Austin deducted two points for fielding an ineligible player on July 25, 2009

Results

References

External links

Miami FC (2006) seasons
Fort Lauderdale Strikers
2009 in sports in Florida